Vincent Anthony Stuart (28 December 1908 – 1974) was an English boxer who competed for Great Britain in the 1936 Summer Olympics.

Biography
He was born in London, England on 28 December 1908.

At the 1930 Empire Games he won the gold medal in the heavyweight class after winning the final against William Skimming of Canada.

In 1936 he was eliminated in the quarterfinals of the heavyweight class at the 1936 Summer Olympics after losing his fight to the eventual gold medallist Herbert Runge of Germany.

Stuart was the Amateur Boxing Association four times heavyweight champion, when boxing out of the London Fire Brigade ABC.

References

External links
Vincent Stuart's profile at databaseOlympics.com
Vincent Stuart's profile at Sports Reference.com

1908 births
1974 deaths
Boxers from Greater London
English male boxers
Heavyweight boxers
Olympic boxers of Great Britain
Boxers at the 1936 Summer Olympics
Boxers at the 1930 British Empire Games
Commonwealth Games gold medallists for England
England Boxing champions
Commonwealth Games medallists in boxing
Medallists at the 1930 British Empire Games